WDLM (960 AM) is a non-commercial radio station licensed to East Moline, Illinois and serving the Quad Cities area with a Christian radio format.  The station broadcasts at a power of 520 watts during daylight hours and 20 watts during nighttime hours.  WDLM-AM's studio and transmitter are located on E200th Street in rural Henry County, Illinois just outside Coal Valley.  Sister station WDLM-FM 89.3 also has its studio at this location.  Both WDLM-AM and WDLM-FM are O&O's of their parent network, the Moody Radio Network, which is owned by the Moody Bible Institute of Chicago. In 2019, Moody announced it intends to sell the station.

According to the frequencies shown on http://www.moodyradioqc.fm/, AM 960 kHz carries Spanish programming.

References

External links
 WDLM Official Website

Radio stations in the Quad Cities
Moody Radio
DLM